The fauna of the State of Oregon includes a wide array of species.

One way of presenting the fauna of Oregon is by classification by lifezone.  Oregon is a vastly diverse state in terms of topography and climate.  Five of the seven recognized lifezones are identified in Oregon.

Mammals

Although there are variable reports, some sources report that there are four species of mammals found exclusively in Oregon: the Baird's shrew, the Pacific shrew, the camas pocket gopher, and the red tree vole (North Oregon Coast "distinct population segment").  However, other sites list the red tree vole as present in northern California.  According to the Oregon State University libraries Oregon Wildlife Explorer website, one hundred thirty-six mammals have been described, exclusive of the marine mammals.  Most of these are smaller creatures weighing under one kilogram, active primarily at night, with a tendency towards more inconspicuous ways of life.  Some of the larger, more iconic, carnivorous species have been driven from the region.  Others are present, but in lesser numbers compared to the smaller species.

The American Society of Mammalogists provides a more exhaustive listing of species. Grizzly bears are no longer listed.  According to the list, 12 specimens of Canada lynx remain.  The gray wolf populations has been increasing in recent years and is monitored by the Oregon Department of Fish and Wildlife.  The first confirmed wolf sighting in western Oregon since 1947, known as Journey OR-7, was born in April, 2009 is

Upper Sonoran zone

Semiarid division of upper Sonoran zone

Extreme arid division of upper sonoran zone

Transition zone

Coastal transition zone

Humid division of the transition zone

Semiarid transition zone

Arid transition zone

Canadian zone

Hudsonian zone

Alpine arctic zone

See also 
 List of fauna of Oregon
 List of mammals of Oregon
 List of birds of Oregon
 List of butterflies of Oregon
 List of amphibians and reptiles of Oregon
 John Day Fossil Beds National Monument#Fauna
 List of ecoregions in Oregon

References

 Oregon Wildlife Species 
 Endangered species of Oregon

 
Natural history of Oregon
Fauna of the Northwestern United States